Tredegar Park is a  public park situated in the western Coedkernew area of the city of Newport, South Wales. It lies close to junction 28 of the M4 motorway connecting London and West Wales.

History 

It formerly formed part of the original 16th century estate of the Morgan family, first substantially redeveloped by William Morgan (of Machen and Tredegar) in the 17th century and owned for generations by the Lords Tredegar. The Grade I building, Tredegar House, and the Grade I listed stables, are also situated within the park.

The present day community (parish) and electoral district (ward) of Tredegar Park is a much smaller area consisting of the Duffryn estate and immediate surroundings.

Parkrun

Parkrun (a UK-wide running series) takes place in the grounds of the park each Saturday at 9am. The first event was hosted in 2011. As of 2019, 435 runs have been held, attracting 14,963 runners from 703 clubs. An average of over 300 people compete each week, however some events have attracted up to 700 competitors.

National Trust

The National Trust took over management of the Country House and Grounds in 2015. As a condition of their management, the grounds and gardens of the house are to remain free for the public to access, with the House entry at £10.10 for adults as part of the Trust's costs to manage their estates.

See also
List of gardens in Wales

External links
 National Trust — Tredegar House
 Newport City Council — Tredegar House
 Trip Advisor — Tredegar House Country Park
 Caravan Club — Tredegar House Country Park

References 

Parks in Newport, Wales
Country parks in Wales